Queen's Wharf is a multipurpose residential and entertainment precinct under construction on either side of William Street in the central business district of Brisbane, Australia.  The megaproject is the largest development undertaken in Queensland and the largest casino resort in Australia.

In July 2015, the Queensland Government announced the Destination Brisbane Consortium of Star Entertainment Group, Chow Tai Fook Enterprises and Far East Consortium, as the successful tenderer for the redevelopment. The mixed-use development will feature 2,000 apartments, 1,100 hotel rooms and a casino.  The project also includes a 1,500 seat-ballroom and a sky-deck observation platform with 360 degree views.

The redevelopment includes the construction of four high-rise buildings and the Neville Bonner Bridge connecting the precinct to South Bank, as well as the repurposing of existing heritage-listed structures within the site. Treasury Casino will close and be converted into a department store. Work commenced in March 2018 with a preliminary 2022 completion date that was updated to 2023.

The project's location was criticized for its proximity to the historical heart of the city and government seat of power.

History
Construction was undertaken by Multiplex. Onsite demolition took over a year to complete. The Neville Bonner building and the Executive building had to be removed.  The height of the Executive building made it the tallest building demolition to take place in Queensland.  More than 33,000 tonnes of rubble were created.  Excavated rock was used to provide fill for the development of a car mall at Brisbane Airport.  During excavation 134-year-old electrical cables were unearthed. Six basements were dug.

By October 2021 the lift cores for both the Dorsett hotel and Rosewood hotels had reached level 21.  In the same month it was reported that 98% of the residencies had already been purchased.

In September 2022, the Sky Deck was raised into place.  This involved the placement of a 175-tonne piece of steel, 100 metres above ground level, between the two curved towers. The Sky Deck will extend 250 metres around the top of two towers.

Design and location
The design aims to integrate tourism, leisure and entertainment facilities in an underutilized part of the city. The site includes 11 state-owned heritage sites. Nine of the sites are open to the public. Queen's Wharf covers a total 26 hectares. Along the river a new mangrove walk will wind along the Riverside Expressway.  The existing bikeway will be upgraded and a new waterline park will be built.  Seven and a half hectares of space have been allocated as public.  The sky deck will be positioned 100 metres above William Street.

The complex is utilizing Building Information Modeling.  A vacuum waste system will be used across the resort.  It will incorporate a central waste handling facility.

Hotels
The three hotels included in the complex are the Star Grand hotel, Dorsett hotel and Rosewood hotel.  The luxury five star Star Grand hotel occupies towers two and three, which are the two curved towers.

See also

List of megaprojects
List of tallest buildings in Brisbane

References

External links

 Queen’s Wharf Brisbane Act 2016

Buildings and structures under construction in Australia
Brisbane
Residential skyscrapers in Australia
Brisbane central business district
Proposed hotels
Star Entertainment Group